This is a list of post secondary Canadian student newspapers, listed by province.

Alberta

British Columbia

Manitoba

New Brunswick

Newfoundland and Labrador

Nova Scotia

Ontario

Prince Edward Island

Quebec

Saskatchewan

See also
 List of student newspapers
 Canadian University Press

References